Catherine Scorsese (née Cappa; April 16, 1912 – January 6, 1997) was an American actress. She began acting when her son Martin Scorsese cast her in his short film It's Not Just You, Murray!. Scorsese was of Italian descent and frequently played the role of an Italian mother. She is perhaps most well known for her appearance in her son's film Goodfellas, as Mrs. DeVito, Tommy's mother. She also published a recipe book, Italianamerican: The Scorsese Family Cookbook.

Biography
She was born on April 16, 1912. She was married to Charles Scorsese. Her father, Martin Cappa, was a stage co-ordinator and her mother, Domenica, was a shop owner. She was the twin of her brother Charles. She also had brothers Salvatore and Andrew and five sisters including Mary and Sarah.

Both of her parents, Domenica and Martin Cappa, were Sicilian. Catherine grew up in a three-room apartment on Elizabeth Street, on the outer reaches of Manhattan's Little Italy, which was shared with 14 people, including boarders and relatives. In 1933, when she was working as a machinist in the nearby Garment District, she married Luciano known as Charles Scorsese, who also lived on Elizabeth Street and was also employed in the garment industry. The experience of growing up in Little Italy among first- and second-generation Italian Americans had a profound influence on her son Martin, who revisited their attitudes, values and way of life in his 1974 documentary, Italianamerican.

Often, she cooked meals for cast and crew members of her son's films.

Her cookbook, Italianamerican: The Scorsese Family Cookbook, was published two months before her death. Scorsese, who had Alzheimer's disease, died on January 6, 1997.

Filmography
 1964 It's Not Just You, Murray! as Mother
 1967 Who's That Knocking at My Door as Mother
 1973 Mean Streets as Woman On Landing (uncredited)
 1974 Italianamerican as herself
 1976 Taxi Driver as Ivy Steensma, Iris’ Mother (uncredited)
 1982 The King of Comedy as Rupert's Mom
 1983 Easy Money as Nicky Cerone's Mother
 1984 The Muppets Take Manhattan as Unknown (uncredited)
 1985 After Hours as Elderly Lady At The Café Sitting Back to The Cashier (uncredited)
 1986 Wise Guys as Birthday Guest
 1987 Moonstruck as Customer At Bakery
 1990 Goodfellas as Mrs. DeVito, Tommy's Mother
 1990 The Godfather Part III as Woman In Cafe #1
 1991 Cape Fear as Fruitstand Customer
 1993 The Age of Innocence as Elderly Woman At Jersey City Station (uncredited) 
 1994 Men Lie as Granddaughter Witness
 1995 Casino as Piscano's Mother (final film role)

References

External links
Catherine Scorsese at Fact Monster

1912 births
1997 deaths
20th-century American actresses
20th-century American writers
20th-century American women writers
American cookbook writers
American film actresses
American people of Italian descent
Deaths from Alzheimer's disease
Deaths from dementia in New York (state)
Actresses from New York City
Martin Scorsese